Kalyn Free is an American attorney, former political candidate, and a tribal citizen of the Choctaw Nation of Oklahoma.

Early legal and political career
Free was born in Red Oak, Oklahoma. Free is a graduate of Red Oak High School, Southeastern Oklahoma State University and the University of Oklahoma College of Law. After she graduated from law school, she began her legal career with the United States Department of Justice. At the time of her employment, she was the youngest attorney ever hired by the Department of Justice. At the Department of Justice, Free prosecuted federal environmental laws across the country with a special emphasis on tribal lands and even became the first Native American to serve as a supervising attorney in the department. 

In 1998, she ran for and became the first woman and the first Native American ever to be elected District Attorney in Pittsburg and Haskell counties of Oklahoma. During her administration, she focused her efforts on fighting for women, children, and crime victim's rights. In 2004, she was a candidate for the Democratic nomination for the open House seat in the 2nd Congressional District, with the support of Emily's List, the Sierra Club, and 21st Century Democrats.  She lost the nomination to the eventual general election winner, Congressman Dan Boren. Following her 2004 bid for Congress, Free was fined approximately $10,000 by the Federal Election Commission for making excessive salary payments to Free.

Recent work
In 2005, Free established a political action committee devoted to electing Native American progressive candidates at the local and state level, INDN's List  (Indigenous Native Democratic Network).  The NDN list closed in 2010.

Throughout 2011 Free worked as the attorney and senior adviser of Bill John Baker's campaign for Principal Chief of the Cherokee Nation against the incumbent Chief, Chad "Corn-tassel" Smith. Free again served as senior advisor on Baker's successful re-election in June 2015. Currently, Free represents Baker as his Special Counsel.

Free is the author of "Why? Rising to the Challenge" in Voices of the Heartland where she describes her career and struggles as a Native American.

Personal life
Free has been married to Steve Bruner since 2009.

Free has an interest in Japan and has represented the United States on trips to Japan sponsored by the American Council of Young Political Leaders.

See also
 Politics of Oklahoma
 Oklahoma Democratic Party
 Choctaw Nation of Oklahoma

References

External links
 Choctaw Nation of Oklahoma homepage

Year of birth missing (living people)
Living people
Native American activists
Choctaw Nation of Oklahoma people
Native American lawyers
21st-century Native Americans
21st-century Native American women